Joseph Ward VC (1832 – 23 November 1872) was born in Kinsale, County Cork, and was an Irish recipient of the Victoria Cross, the highest and most prestigious award for gallantry in the face of the enemy that can be awarded to British and Commonwealth forces.

Details
Ward was about 26 years old, and a sergeant in the 8th King's Royal Irish Hussars, British Army during the Indian Mutiny when the following deed took place for which he was awarded the VC. On 17 June 1858 at Gwalior, India, Sergeant Ward – together with Captain Clement Walker Heneage, Farrier George Hollis and Private John Pearson – was in a charge made by a squadron of the 8th Hussars when, supported by a division of the Bombay Horse Artillery and the 95th Regiment, they routed the enemy and captured two of the enemy's guns. Their citation read:

Further information
He died at Longford on 23 November 1872.

References

Listed in order of publication year 
The Register of the Victoria Cross (1981, 1988 and 1997)

Ireland's VCs  (Dept of Economic Development, 1995)
Monuments to Courage (David Harvey, 1999)
Irish Winners of the Victoria Cross (Richard Doherty & David Truesdale, 2000)

External links
Location of grave and VC medal (Co. Longford, Ireland)

1832 births
1872 deaths
19th-century Irish people
Irish soldiers in the British Army
People from Kinsale
Irish recipients of the Victoria Cross
8th King's Royal Irish Hussars soldiers
Indian Rebellion of 1857 recipients of the Victoria Cross
British Army recipients of the Victoria Cross
Military personnel from County Cork
Burials in the Republic of Ireland